Wisdom (Z333) is a wild female Laysan albatross. She is the oldest confirmed wild bird in the world as well as the oldest banded bird in the world.

Biography

Banding 
Wisdom hatched around 1951, and possibly earlier. In 1956, she was tagged by scientists as #Z333 at the Midway Atoll National Wildlife Refuge. It is likely that Wisdom is older than 70, as, when she was banded in 1956, she was conservatively estimated to be five years old — the earliest age that the Laysan albatross reaches sexual maturity. The person to attach the first tag was Chandler Robbins, who was a senior scientist at the United States Geological Survey (USGS). Birds are banded so that their populations can be monitored and individuals' longevity, behavior and migration patterns can be studied.

The USGS have tracked Wisdom since she was first tagged and estimated that Wisdom has flown over  since 1956 (approximately 120 times the circumference of the Earth). To accommodate her longevity, the USGS have replaced her tag a total of six times.

Fertility 
Albatrosses lay one egg per year, and have monogamous mates for life. Smithsonian speculated that, due to Wisdom's unusual longevity, she may have had to find another mate in order to continue breeding. Biologists estimated that Wisdom has laid some 30–40 eggs in her lifetime and that she has at least 30–36 chicks. She has successfully hatched a chick every year since 2006. 

 Between 2005 and 2014, Wisdom laid eight eggs.  She and her chick survived the 2011 Tōhoku earthquake and tsunami that killed an estimated 2,000 adult Laysan and black-footed albatrosses and a much larger number of chicks at the Refuge.
 On December 3, 2014, Wisdom made headlines when she laid an egg at Midway Atoll. Her mate had arrived at the atoll on November 19, and Wisdom was first spotted by the Refuge staff on November 22. The egg was estimated to be the 36th she had laid. 

 She hatched and reared another chick in December 2016 at the approximate age of 66. 
 In December 2017, she bred again. 
 In December 2018, United States Fish and Wildlife Service (USFWS) Pacific Region reported that Wisdom had returned to the Midway Atoll and laid an egg, which hatched in February 2019.
 In December 2020, it was reported that Wisdom was again incubating an egg. The chick hatched on February 1, 2021.
 On November 26, 2021, she was once again seen at the atoll. Her long-time mate, Akeakamai, did not return, and she did not breed that season. But her chick from 2011 had a chick of its own (making Wisdom "a granny").  
 In December 2022, it was reported that Wisdom had been spotted on Midway Atoll in the new season, but Akeakamai was still missing.

Impact 
The USFWS stated, "Wisdom's continued contribution to the fragile albatross population is remarkable and important. Her health and dedication have led to the birth of other healthy offspring which will help recover albatross populations on Laysan and other islands."

Bruce Peterjohn, chief of the North American Bird Banding Program, stated that Wisdom "[was] now the oldest wild bird documented in the 90-year history of [the] USGS-FWS and Canadian bird banding program. To know that she can still successfully raise young at age 60-plus, that is beyond words."

Wisdom has received coverage from many major news sources in the United States and elsewhere, including The Guardian, National Geographic, Discovery News, and 60 Minutes. In January 2020, Wisdom was featured in episode 3, "Hawaii", of BBC Two's Earth's Tropical Islands.

See also
 List of individual birds

References

External links

1951 animal births
Albatrosses
Individual seabirds
Oldest animals